The Delors Commission was the administration of Jacques Delors, the eighth President of the European Commission. Delors presided over the European Commission for three terms (though the last one lasted for around a year). The first term lasted from 1985 to 1988, the second until 1992 and the final one until 1994, making Delors the longest serving president, and his Commission is also seen as the most successful at advancing European integration. It was the only Commission to serve three times, and Delors served five two-year terms (as they were then). The third Commission was the first Commission of the European Union, the Maastricht Treaty having come into force in 1993.

History
The European Commissions led by Jacques Delors are regarded by some as the most successful in the European Union's history at advancing integration. Delors himself became an icon of Euro-federalists and widely disliked by Eurosceptics, especially in Britain.

Entrance

Delors entered office when eurosclerosis was at its height. The slow pace of enlargement, lack of democracy and economic problems caused that negative and apathetic attitudes to the Community were high. The preceding Thorn Commission was unable to exercise its authority to any meaningful extent in the face of the British vetoes on EU projects to force a more favourable agreement for it on the Community budget. Delors had previously been one of the architects of the agreement at Fontainebleau, which secured the UK rebate, and Delors intended that the settling of the budget issue should herald a new era of European integration.

Following Delors' arrival in Brussels, he visited the various member states and found the same complaint that Europe reacted too slowly to issues, but did find common agreement on the single market, with its business and cultural meaning, and hence Delors placed it as his main priority with a date for its achievement: 1992 (Objectif 1992). Despite his modern reputation he was criticised by federalists for not going far enough, even earning criticism from Altiero Spinelli in the European Parliament, but Delors defended his goals as pragmatic stating "we are all slaves to the circumstances" . To accomplish his goal of completing the single market, Delors had to master the political system of the community: with any member able to block a proposal in the Council, Delors convinced leaders to introduce Qualified Majority Voting so the procedure could not grind to a halt as it did under the budget disagreement. Thus, Delors set Lord Cockfield, his Internal Market Commissioner, in drafting the legislation. Now, Cockfield's work is seen as highly precise and his knowledge of the system legendary.

Achievements

The Delors Commission gave a new momentum to the process of European integration. They 'completed' the internal market and laid the foundations for the single European currency. European Economic and Monetary Union was based on the three stage plan drawn up by a committee headed by Delors (the Delors Report). Delors and his Commissioners are considered the "founding fathers" of the euro. The groundwork and political persuasion was achieved through the work of the Commissioners leading to the signature of the Single European Act (SEA) in February 1986 and the Treaty of Maastricht in 1992.

The Delors Commission was also responsible for the creation of the Committee of the Regions, having enshrined the idea of cohesion between EU states and regions in the SEA in 1986 leading Delors to propose the body in 1992. It was created in 1994 and the building the body occupies was named after Delors in 2006. Delors' Commission oversaw a large degree of expansion. The membership of Spain and Portugal came first in 1985; then the fall of the Berlin Wall enabled the Reunification of Germany; and in 1995 came the accession of Austria, Finland and Sweden. The Delors Commission also prepared the opening to the eastern countries who later joined in 2004.

In 1988 Delors addressed the British Trade Union Congress; his speech about a social Europe was pivotal in turning British Labour pro-European and the British Conservatives against it. In 1992, as Delors' second term was coming to an end, the International Herald Tribune noted the effect of the Delors Commission, and the need for a third term;

Following his entrance into a Europe of eurosclerosis, Delors had heralded 20 years of euphoria. In contrast, the Santer Commission which succeeded Delors in 1995 was forced to resign over allegations of corruption and the Prodi Commission won little praise despite presiding over the 2004 enlargement and the implementation of the single currency.

In opposition to the strident neoliberalism of American President Ronald Reagan (1981–1989) which dominated the American political agenda, Delors and his Commission promoted an alternative interpretation of capitalism that embedded it in the European social structure. He synthesized three themes. From the left came favouring the redistribution of wealth, and the protection of the weakest. Second a neo-mercantilist approach wanted to maximize European industrial output.  A third was reliance on the marketplace. His emphasis on the social nature of Europe is central to an important exceptionalism narrative that became central to the self identification of the European Union.

Major events

The commission was the longest serving executive to date and oversaw many events in the history of the Union.
 1985: Greenland leaves the Community. Gravier ruling by the ECJ on non-discrimination by nationality.
 1986: Spain and Portugal join the Communities. The Single European Act is signed. Marshall ruling by the ECJ on non-discrimination by gender. The European flag is adopted by the Communities, it is raised outside the Berlaymont.
 1987: 30 years since the Treaties of Rome. Membership application submitted by Turkey. Single European Act enters into force.
 1988: Delors asked to draw up a report on Economic and Monetary Union (the Delors Report). The Court of First Instance is established. The Delors Package I was adopted, increasing the budget (notably for structural policy) and reforming the budgetary procedure.
 1989: Cowan ruling by the ECJ on non-discrimination by nationality. Delors Report presented. Declaration of Fundamental Rights and Freedoms adopted by the Parliament. Third direct elections to Parliament held. Spain and Portugal join the European Monetary System. Berlin Wall falls, leading to agreements and accession of eastern countries. Lomé Convention signed. First European Union Merger law adopted.
 1990: Commission meets for 1000th time. European Bank for Reconstruction and Development established. Schengen agreement signed. Reunification of Germany.
 1991: Stoeckel ruling by the ECJ on non-discrimination by gender. ECHO established. Energy Charter signed. USSR dissolves.
 1992: Maastricht Treaty signed, Denmark fails to ratify. European Economic Area (EEA) agreement signed, Switzerland fails to ratify.
 1993: Single European Market enters force. Maastricht is ratified and enters into force.
 1994: European Monetary Institute established. EEA enters force. Committee of the Regions established. Accession negotiations for Austria, Norway, Sweden and Finland conclude. European Investment Fund established. Hungary and Poland apply to join. Fourth direct elections to the Parliament are held.

Members
The three Delors Commissions (generally known as "Delors I", Delors II" and "Delors III") had considerable continuity of membership and political balance, but there were nonetheless differences.

First college
This Commission served from 1985 to 1988, although the Spanish and Portuguese members only joined as from their countries' membership of the European Communities on 1 January 1986.

Second college
This Commission served from 1989 to 1992.

Third college
This Commission served from 1993 to 1994. It was the first Commission of the European Union, with the Maastricht Treaty coming into force. Its short tenure was designed to bring the mandates of the Commission into line with those of the European Parliament.

Key
The colour of the row indicates the approximate political leaning of the office holder using the following scheme:

Secretary-General
The Secretary-General of the European Commission throughout the three Delors Commissions was David Williamson.

See also
Single European Act
Treaty of Maastricht
EMU
Delors building
 European Navigator

Footnotes

References
 European Commission archive of the Delors I Commission. "" Retrieved 17 March 2007.
 EU Press release (1988). "Responsibilities of the members of the new commission". Retrieved 24 March 2005.
 EU Press release (1992). "Composition of the new Commission". Retrieved 17 March 2007.

External links
Delors Report ec.europa.eu
Photos of the First Delors Commission ec.europa.eu
Photos of the Second Delors Commission ec.europa.eu
Photos of the Third Delors Commission ec.europa.eu
History of the EU, 1985 europa.eu

 
European Commissions